Philip Thorp (6 May 1911 – December 2006) was an English first-class cricketer who played in two matches for Worcestershire in 1935. He was born in Kidderminster, Worcestershire.

On his debut against Surrey, he was unfortunate to come up against an irresistible first-innings spell of bowling from Alf Gover, who finished with 8-34 (his career best) as Worcestershire were skittled for 73. Thorp made 11 of those, being one of four Worcestershire batsman to reach double figures (no-one reached 20). In the second innings he scored only 8 (again being dismissed by Gover). He played one more match, against Lancashire, but made a pair.

External links
 

1911 births
2006 deaths
English cricketers
Worcestershire cricketers
Sportspeople from Kidderminster